Hinton is a city in Plymouth County, Iowa, United States. The population was 935 at the time of the 2020 census.

History
A post office called Hinton has been in operation since 1870. The city was named by a settler from Hinton, West Virginia.

Geography
Hinton is located at  (42.625066, -96.294285).

Demographics

2010 census
As of the census of 2010, there were 928 people, 363 households, and 270 families living in the city. The racial makeup of the city was 98.8% White, 0.3% African American, 0.2% Native American, 0.2% Asian, 0.1% from other races, and 0.3% from two or more races. Hispanic or Latino of any race were 0.6% of the population.

There were 363 households, of which 35.3% had children under the age of 18 living with them, 63.9% were married couples living together, 6.9% had a female householder with no husband present, 3.6% had a male householder with no wife present, and 25.6% were non-families. 22.3% of all households were made up of individuals, and 9.6% had someone living alone who was 65 years of age or older. The average household size was 2.56 and the average family size was 2.99.

The median age in the city was 39.1 years. 26.4% of residents were under the age of 18; 6.2% were between the ages of 18 and 24; 24.8% were from 25 to 44; 28.6% were from 45 to 64; and 14% were 65 years of age or older. The gender makeup of the city was 51.5% male and 48.5% female.

2000 census
As of the census of 2000, there were 808 people, 303 households, and 226 families living in the city. The racial makeup of the city was 97.90% White, 0.50% African American, 0.37% Asian, 0.12% Pacific Islander, 0.37% from other races, and 0.74% from two or more races. Hispanic or Latino of any race were 0.62% of the population.

There were 303 households, out of which 39.3% had children under the age of 18 living with them, 66.0% were married couples living together, 6.6% had a female householder with no husband present, and 25.1% were non-families. 19.5% of all households were made up of individuals, and 10.2% had someone living alone who was 65 years of age or older. The average household size was 2.67 and the average family size was 3.08.

In the city, the population was spread out, with 28.1% under the age of 18, 6.1% from 18 to 24, 27.2% from 25 to 44, 25.4% from 45 to 64, and 13.2% who were 65 years of age or older. The median age was 38 years. For every 100 females, there were 98.0 males. For every 100 females age 18 and over, there were 95.6 males.

Education
The Hinton Community School District operates local public schools.

Hinton's high school mascot is the Blackhawk, presumably after Ioway Indian tribal leader Chief Black Hawk. The school's athletics teams compete in the War Eagle Conference.  The boys' and girls' golf teams both made state appearances in 2004, 2006 & 2007, with the boys winning 1st place overall in 2006.

Notable people
Ron Wieck, graduated from Hinton High School, Republican member of Iowa Senate 2003–2010
Sam Clovis, former fighter pilot and retired United States Air Force colonel, former economics professor, talk radio host, national co-chair and chief policy adviser to Donald Trump's 2016 presidential campaign, and the senior White House adviser under President Donald Trump to the United States Department of Agriculture until May 4, 2018

References

External links
 Hinton Community School Website

Cities in Iowa
Cities in Plymouth County, Iowa
1870 establishments in Iowa